Julie is a 1956 American film noir written and directed by Andrew L. Stone and starring Doris Day, Louis Jourdan and Barry Sullivan. The film is among the earliest to feature the subplot of a stewardess piloting an aircraft to safety, later used in Airport 1975 (1975) and parodied in Airplane! (1980). Julie is also notable for being technically accurate in its use of contemporary aviation technology.

Plot
A former stewardess, widow Julie Benton (Doris Day), flying for "Amalgamated Airlines" is terrorized by her insanely jealous second husband, concert pianist Lyle (Louis Jourdan). It becomes a life-or-death matter after friend Cliff Henderson (Barry Sullivan) relays his suspicions to Julie that her first husband's death may not have been a suicide.

She pretends that she would have fallen for Lyle even if her first husband had still been alive, and Lyle confesses the murder to her. Julie flees with Cliff's help, but police are unable to arrest Lyle without proof.

Julie and Cliff hire a car and drive north to San Francisco where Julie changes her identity, and returns to her former job with the airline. Lyle has a confrontation with Cliff, Lyle shoots him and learns where Julie can be found.

With police in pursuit, Julie is warned that Lyle may be on her flight. She spots him, but Lyle pulls a gun on her, then kills the pilot before being shot himself. Julie is "talked down" receiving instructions on how to fly the aircraft. She does so successfully, and her nightmare comes to an end.

Cast

 Doris Day as Julie Benton
 Louis Jourdan as Lyle Benton
 Barry Sullivan as Cliff Henderson
 Frank Lovejoy as Det. Lt. Pringle
 Jack Kelly as Jack (co-pilot)
 Ann Robinson as Valerie
Pamela Duncan as Peggy
 Barney Phillips as Doctor on Flight 36
 Jack Kruschen as Det. Mace
 John Gallaudet as Det. Sgt. Cole
 Carleton Young as Airport Control Tower Official
 Hank Patterson as Ellis
 Ed Hinton as Captain of Flight 36
 Harlan Warde as Det. Pope
 Aline Towne as Denise Martin
 Eddie Marr as Airline Official
 Joel Marston as Garage Mechanic
 Mae Marsh as Hysterical Passenger

Production
The movie's working title was If I Can't Have You. Stone's signing was announced in January 1956.

Arwin Productions was the production firm recently formed by Day and her husband Martin Melcher.

The aircraft in Julie were Douglas R5D-1/3 Skymaster four-engined cargo and passenger airliners from Transocean Air Lines, a charter company based at Oakland International Airport, (San Francisco).

The soundtrack includes music by three composers. The song "Midnight on the Cliffs" by pianist/composer Leonard Pennario, is repeatedly heard as Doris Day frantically attempts to avoid being murdered by Louis Jourdan. The song "Dream Rhapsody", also by Pennario, is based on themes taken directly from the Symphony in D minor by César Franck.

Reception

Box office
According to MGM records, Julie earned $1,415,000 in the US and Canada and $1,185,000 elsewhere resulting in a profit of $604,000.

Critical response
Aviation film historian Stephen Pendo in Aviation in the Cinema (1985) described Julie as a "minor film."

Film critic Dennis Schwartz, gave Julie a mixed review, writing, "Improbable crime thriller about a woman-in-peril, that is too uneven to be effective; the banal dialogue is the final killer. ... Doris Day, to her credit, gives it her best shot and tries to take it seriously even when the melodrama moves way past the point of just being ridiculous. Later disaster movies stole some of those airplane landing scenes."

In a contemporaneous review, New York Times critic Bosley Crowther panned the film, writing, "Let's say the whole thing is contrivance and the acting is in the same vein. Miss Day wrings her hands and looks frantic not so much because she feels it as because she gets her cues." Of Andrew Stone's direction, Crowther went on to say, "...it is quite clear that Mr. Stone set out to keep the heroine under menace all the way, no matter how coldly calculated or improbable that might be."

The Washington Evening Star summed up the film as "a movie that leaves audiences more in the debt of the cameraman and Andrew Stone's freewheeling direction than anyone else....Quite irrationally, most of the way, it relates the story of a freckled blond girl who discovers she has married a lethally jealous concert pianist. This chap...is one with whom a girl could be relaxed only on a desert island where she would meet no other male, including a barracuda."

Julie is listed in Golden Raspberry Award founder John Wilson's book The Official Razzie Movie Guide as one of the "100 Most Enjoyably Bad Movies Ever Made".

Accolades
Julie was nominated for an Academy Award for Best Original Screenplay and Best Song ("Julie" by Leith Stevens and Tom Adair, which Doris Day sings during the opening credits).

See also
List of American films of 1956

References

Notes

Citations

Bibliography

 Paris, Michael. From the Wright Brothers to Top Gun: Aviation, Nationalism, and Popular Cinema. Manchester, UK: Manchester University Press, 1995. .
 Pendo, Stephen. Aviation in the Cinema. Lanham, Maryland: Scarecrow Press, 1985. .
 Wilson, John. The Official Razzie Movie Guide: Enjoying the Best of Hollywood's Worst. New York: Grand Central Publishing, 2005. .

External links
 
 
 
 
 

1956 films
1950s thriller films
American mystery films
American thriller films
American aviation films
American black-and-white films
Film noir
Films directed by Andrew L. Stone
Films scored by Leith Stevens
Films set in California
Metro-Goldwyn-Mayer films
1950s English-language films
1950s American films